Simon is a surname. Notable people with the surname include the following.

A
 Abbey Simon (1920–2019), Jewish-American pianist
 Abram Simon (1872–1938), American rabbi
 Alice Simon (1887–1943), German victim from the nazis
 André Simon (wine) (1877–1970), French wine expert 
 André Simon (racing driver) (1920–2012), French racing car driver
 Anne Simon, American science advisor on the TV series The X-Files

B
 Barry Simon (born 1946), American mathematical physicist
 Barry Simon (politician) (1936–2004), Australian politician
 Ben Simon (born 1978), American ice hockey player
 Bill Simon (politician) (born 1951), American businessman and politician
 Bill Simon (musician) (1920–2000), American jazz musician
 Björn Simon (born 1981), German politician
 Bob Simon (1941–2015), American correspondent on CBS News

C
 Calvin Simon (1942–2022), American musician
 Carlos Eugênio Simon (born 1965), Brazilian FIFA football referee
 Carly Simon (born 1943), American singer-songwriter/musician
 Carrie Obendorfer Simon (1872–1961), American communal leader
 Chase Simon (born 1989), American basketball player for Maccabi Ashdod of the Israeli Basketball Premier League
 Chris Simon (born 1972), Canadian ice hockey player
 Claude Simon (1913–2005), French novelist
 Cliff Simon (1962–2021), South African athlete and actor
 Corey Simon (born 1977), former American football player
 Cosette Simon, American politician

D
 Danny Simon (1918–2005), American television writer
 David Simon (basketball) (born 1982), American basketball player
 David Simon (CEO), American CEO of Simon Property Group
 David Simon, Baron Simon of Highbury (born 1935), British businessman
 David Simon (writer) (born 1960), American author and journalist
 Dean Simon (born 1960), American professional wrestler better known as Dean Malenko
 Dick Simon (born 1933), American racing driver
 Dick Simon (entrepreneur) (born 1953), American entrepreneur, philanthropist, photographer and speaker
 Diederik Simon (born 1970), Dutch rower
 Diosdado Simón (1954–2002), Spanish biologist
 Dominik Simon (born 1994), Czech ice hockey player

E
 Edgardo Simón (born 1974), Argentinian track and road cyclist
 Edward Simon (choreographer), American choreographer
 Edward Simon (musician) (born 1969), American musician
 Eleazar ben Simon, 1st century Zealot leader
 Émilie Simon (born 1978), French singer and composer
 Ernst Simon (1899–1988), German-Israeli Jewish educator
 Ernst Julius Walter Simon (1893–1981), British Sinologist
 Eugène Simon (1848–1924), French arachnologist

F
 Francesca Simon (born 1955), Anglo-American author
 Francis Simon (born Franz Eugen Simon) (1893–1956), German/British physical chemist
 François Pascal Simon, Baron Gérard (1770–1837), French painter

G
 George Simon (disambiguation), several people
 Geroy Simon (born 1975), Canadian footballer
 Glyn Simon (1903–1972), Archbishop of Wales (1968–1971)
 Gilles Simon (born 1984), French tennis player
 Günther Simon (1925–1972), East German actor
 Gustav Simon (1900–1945), German Chief of the Civil Administration in Nazi occupied Luxembourg  (1940–1945)
 Gustav Simon (physician) (1824–1876), German surgeon

H
 Harry Simon (boxer) (born 1972), Namibian boxer
 Harry Simon (sport shooter) (1873–1932), American sport shooter
 Helmut Simon, German discoverer of Ötzi the Iceman
 Henri Simon (1866–1956), French army officer
 Herbert A. Simon (1916–2001), American cognitive psychologist and polymath
 Herbert Simon (real estate) (born 1934), American real estate developer

I
 Ingo Simon (1875–1964), English archer, singer, and writer

J
 Jean-Claude Simon (born 1948), French research scientist
 Jeanne Hurley Simon (1922–2000), American politician
 Jed Simon (born 1964), Canadian musician
 Jerry Simon (born 1968), American-Israeli basketball player
 Joanna Simon (mezzo-soprano) (1936–2022), American mezzo-soprano and journalist
 Joanna Simon (wine writer), British author and wine columnist
 Jocelyn Simon, Baron Simon of Glaisdale (1911–2006), British politician and QC
 Jody Simon (born 1956), American professional wrestler better known as Joe Malenko
 Joe Simon (1913–2011), Jewish-American comic book writer
 Joe Simon (musician) (1936–2021), American soul and R&B artist
 John Simon various, including :
 John Simon (1925–2019), American author and literary, film and drama critic
 John Simon (record producer) (born 1941), American record producer for Columbia Records
 Sir John Simon (doctor) (1816–1904), Chief Medical Officer for England, 1855–76
 John L. Simon (Jack Simon), U.S. national swimming coach
 Joseph Minos Simon (1922–2004), American attorney
 Josef Simon (1930–2016), German philosopher
 Joseph Simon (politician) (1851–1935), German-born American politician
 Josette Simon (born 1960), British actress
 Joshua Simon, Israeli art curator and journalist from Tel Aviv
 Jules Simon (1814–1896), French statesman and philosopher
 Julián Simón (born 1987), Spanish motorcycle racer
 Julian Lincoln Simon (1932–1998), American business professor
 Justin Simon (born 1996), American basketball player

K
 K. V. Simon (1883–1944), Indian poet
 Kay Simon, American winemaker
 Kerry Simon, American celebrity chef
 Kevin Simon (born 1983), American football player

L
 Lawrence Simon (1933–1994), American professional wrestler better known as Boris Malenko (also father of Dean and Jody Simon, aka Dean and Joe Malenko)
 Leon Simon (born 1945), Australian mathematician, professor at Stanford
 Leon Simon (Zionist) (1881–1965), British intellectual and civil servant; President of the Hebrew University of Jerusalem
 Leslie Earl Simon (1900–1983), American scientist
 Lidia Șimon (born 1973), Romanian long-distance athlete
 Lou Anna Simon, American, President of Michigan State University
 Lowrell Simon (1943–2018), American singer (of The Lost Generation (band))
 Lucy Simon (1943–2022), American singer

M
 Maria Simon (actress) (born 1976), German actress
 Maria Simon (sociologist) (1918–2022), Austrian sociologist
 Marge Simon (born 1942), American artist and writer
 Melissa Simon, American clinical obstetrician/gynecologist
 Melvin Simon (1926–2009), American real estate developer and film producer
 Melvin Simon (basketball) (born 1971), American professional basketball player
 Melvin I. Simon (born 1937), American molecular biologist and geneticist
 Michel Simon (1895–1975), Swiss actor
 Mike Simon (1883–1963), American baseball player
 Miles Simon (born 1975), American basketball player

N
 Neil Simon (1927–2018), American playwright and screenwriter
 Norton Simon (1907–1993), American industrialist

O
 Oliver Simon (1957–2013), German singer of the pop duo Mixed Emotions

P
 Pál Simon (1881–1922), Hungarian athlete
 Paul Simon (born 1941), American musician (of Simon & Garfunkel)
 Paul Simon (politician) (1928–2003), U.S. senator
 Paul Ludwig Simon (1771–1815), German architect and scientist
 Peter Simon (actor) (born 1943), American actor
 Peter Simon (presenter) (born 1962), British television presenter
 Peter June Simon (born 1980), Filipino professional basketball player

R
 Lady Rachel Simon (1823–1899), British writer
 Rachel Simon (born 1959), American writer
 Ralph Simon, South African business executive
 Randall Simon (born 1975), Major League baseball player from Netherlands Antilles
 Raymond Simon, American educator
 Richard Simon (priest) (1638–1712), French biblical critic
 Richard Simon (painter) (1898–1993), German expressionist painter, pseudonym Simmerl
 Richard L. Simon (1899–1960), American businessman
 Roberlandy Simon (born 1987), Cuban volleyball player
 Robert E. Simon (born 1914), American property developer
 Roger L. Simon (born 1943), American author
 Roger Simon (journalist) (born 1948), American journalist and author

S
 S. J. Simon (1904–1948), British author
 Sam Simon (1955–2015), American television producer and writer
 Scott Simon (born 1952), American journalist
 Shena Simon (1883–1972), British politician, feminist, educationalist and writer
 Simone Simon (1910–2005), French film actress
 Sindee Simon, American chemical engineer
 Siôn Simon (born 1968), British Labour Party politician
 Stephen Simon (1937–2013), American conductor, composer, and arranger of classical music

T
 Tamás Simon (1935–1956), Hungarian poet and playwright
 T. F. Simon (1877–1942), Czech artist
 Ted Simon (born 1931), British journalist
 Theodore Simon (1872–1961), French psychologist
 Thomas Simon (1623–1665), English engraver

W
 Walt Simon (1939–1997), American basketball player
 Walter Simon (philanthropist) (1857–1920), German philanthropist
 William E. Simon (1927–2000), United States Secretary of the Treasury (1974–77)

Y
 Yehude Simon (born 1947), Peruvian politician

Z
 Zoe Kelli Simon (born 1965), American actress

Fictional characters
Mark Simon, a character in the 1998 American science-fiction disaster movie Deep Impact

See also
 Simon (disambiguation)
 Baron Simon of Wythenshawe
 Saint-Simon
 Simone
 Simons
Symon

References

Surnames from given names
Patronymic surnames
English-language surnames
German-language surnames
French-language surnames
Jewish surnames